Slezak is a Czech, Slovak and Polish surname, which originally meant a person from Silesia, derived from the Czech word slezsko. Variants of the name include Ślązak, Slezák, Ślęzak, Slenzak, and Szlezák. The name may refer to:

Dalibor Slezák (born 1970), Czech football player
Erika Slezak (born 1946), American actress
Janusz Ślązak (1907–1985), Polish rower 
Jim Slezak (born 1966), American politician
John Slezak (1896–1984), American businessman
Katarina Krpež Slezak (born 1988), Serbian handballer
Leo Slezak (1873–1946), Czech opera singer
 Margarete Slezak (1901-1953), Austrian actress 
Ron Slenzak (born 1948), American photographer
Victor Slezak (born 1957), American actor
Walter Slezak (1902–1983), Austrian actor
Zoltán Szlezák (born 1967), Hungarian footballer

References

See also
 
 

Czech-language surnames
Slovak-language surnames
Polish-language surnames